Milad Fakhroddini (born May 26, 1990) is an Iranian professional footballer who plays as a right back for Aluminium Arak in the Persian Gulf Pro League.

Club career
Fakhreddini started his senior career with Mes Kerman in 2010 and he spent three years at the club making forty-four appearances before moving to Tractor. He helped Tractor achieve a runners-up finish in the Iran Pro League. In June 2014, Fakhreddini signed with Esteghlal.

Assist Goals

International career
He made his debut against Mauritania in April 2012 under Carlos Queiroz.

Honours
Tractor
Hazfi Cup (2): 2013–14  2019–20
Naft Tehran
Hazfi Cup (1): 2016–17

References
3. میلاد فخرالدینی به آلومینیوم اراک پیوست Retaved in Persian www.isna.ir خبرگزاری ایسنا

4. فخرالدینی، خرید جدید آلومینیوم اراک Retaved in Persian www.tasnimnews.com خبرگزاری تسنیم

5. فخرالدینی به آلومینیوم اراک پیوست Retaved in Persian www.farsnews.com خبرگزاری فارس

6. فخرالدینی به تیم فوتبال آلومینیوم اراک پیوست Retaved in Persian www.mehrnews.com خبرگزاری مهر

External links

 Milad Fakhreddini at PersianLeague.com
 Milad Fakhreddini at metafootball 
 
 
 

1990 births
Living people
Iranian footballers
People from Kerman
Sanat Mes Kerman F.C. players
Tractor S.C. players
Esteghlal F.C. players
Zob Ahan Esfahan F.C. players
Persian Gulf Pro League players
Iran international footballers
Association football fullbacks
Association football wingers
People from Kerman Province